Little Black Book is a 2004 American satirical comedy-drama film directed by Nick Hurran and starring Brittany Murphy, Holly Hunter, Ron Livingston, Julianne Nicholson, and Kathy Bates. Carly Simon makes a cameo appearance at the end of the film.

Plot
Stacy Holt is an associate producer on a talk show hosted by the domineering Kippie Kann. Stacy believes that "luck is when preparation meets opportunity". Her boyfriend Derek appears to be the fulfillment of all of her wishes, despite his reluctance to commit or discuss his past relationships.

When Stacy brings home tapes of the show to study, Derek recognizes a guest, his ex-girlfriend, a French model Lulu. When he refuses to answer Stacy's questions about their relationship, Stacy confides in her co-workers Barb and Ira about her misgivings. Inspired by Ira's pitch about using PalmPilots—the modern-day "little black book"—to investigate a lover's secrets, Barb and Ira encourage Stacy to use Derek's to learn more about him.

Under the guise of possibly inviting Lulu back to The Kippie Kann Show, Stacy, Barb, and Ira question her about Derek. Lulu says she stole Derek away from his then-serious girlfriend Joyce, adding that their relationship was purely sexual. Back at her apartment, Stacy becomes increasingly insecure, listening to answering machine messages for Derek, looking through his box of mementos from former girlfriends and finally his PalmPilot. She finds pictures of two of his exes on it, Joyce and Rachel. Stacy makes a doctor's appointment to meet Rachel, whom she believes is a podiatrist.

Stacy discovers that Rachel is actually a gynecologist, and notices that Rachel has pictures of Derek's dog, Bob, in her office. Pretending it is research for the show, Stacy interviews Rachel, who reveals that she and Derek share custody of Bob and still see each other occasionally.

Stacy then meets Joyce, and the two strike up a friendship, although Stacy feels guilty for befriending Joyce under false pretenses. When Joyce receives a call from Derek, she asks Joyce about them. Joyce admits to Stacy that she still hopes that she and Derek will reunite.

Stacy panics and shows Joyce the interview with Lulu where she brags how Derek only went back to Joyce because Lulu became bored with him. Devastated, Joyce ends her friendship with Derek. Stacy feels guilty for making Joyce so unhappy and wonders if her investigation did anything to improve her own relationship with Derek.

At The Kippie Kann Show, production prepares for the live show and Stacy is given lead responsibilities. She is thrust on stage, discovering that her investigations into Derek's past are, in fact, the subject matter. Barb orchestrated the episode and invited Lulu, Rachel, Joyce, and Derek to the show. All are confused and hurt by the lies, especially Joyce and Derek. Stacy apologizes to the women and to Derek, tearfully breaking up with him and admitting that she is not right for him. She encourages him to reconcile with Joyce before quitting on air. Stacy goes backstage to confront Barb, who tries to defend her actions and congratulate Stacy on the episode's success. Stacy rebuffs her (to the live audience's applause) and leaves.

Interviewing for a job under Diane Sawyer, Stacy reflects on her experiences with the interviewer, eventually landing the job. On her way out, she is thrilled to meet her idol, Carly Simon.

Cast

Reception

Box office
Little Black Book opened at number five at the North American box office, grossing $7,075,217 in its opening weekend behind Collateral, The Village, The Bourne Supremacy, and The Manchurian Candidate. The film ended its run with a domestic total of $20,698,668 and an international addition of $1,336,164, totaling $22,034,832 worldwide.

Critical response
The film received negative reviews. On the review aggregator website Rotten Tomatoes, the film holds an approval rating of 22% based on reviews from 111 critics, with an average rating of 4.4/10. The website's critics consensus reads, "An obnoxious, awkward mix of romantic comedy and reality show satire." Metacritic, which uses a weighted average, assigned the film a score of 36 out of 100, based on 33 critics, indicating "generally unfavorable reviews".

Entertainment Weekly Scott Brown awarded Little Black Book a D, stating, "The big climax isn't climactic, just hysterical and incoherent. Murphy, with her bug-eyed, love-me mugging, is simply too slight and gawky to play the Everygirl." Similarly, Carla Meyer of the San Francisco Chronicle gave the film a poor review, criticizing the script and acting.

The film received some positive reviews; Andrea Gronvall of the Chicago Reader praised the film's humor, rating the film three and a half stars. Roger Ebert awarded the film three stars out of four and praised Murphy's performance.

References

External links

 
 
 

2004 films
2004 romantic comedy-drama films
2000s American films
2000s English-language films
2000s satirical films
American romantic comedy-drama films
American satirical films
Columbia Pictures films
Films about television
Films directed by Nick Hurran
Films scored by Christophe Beck
Films set in New Jersey
Films set in New York City
Films shot in California
Films shot in Massachusetts
Films shot in New York City
Workplace comedy films